Ernest Jenkin Eustice (30 November 1904 – 30 March 1958) was a South African boxer who competed in the 1924 Summer Olympics. Eustice was born and died in Johannesburg. In 1924, Eustice was eliminated in the first round of the featherweight class after losing his fight to Marcel Depont of France.

References

External links
profile

1904 births
1958 deaths
Featherweight boxers
Olympic boxers of South Africa
Boxers at the 1924 Summer Olympics
Boxers from Johannesburg
Transvaal Colony people
South African male boxers